Micragrotis marwitzi is a species of moth of the family Noctuidae first described by Max Gaede in 1935. It is found in Africa, including South Africa.

External links
 

Endemic moths of South Africa
Noctuinae